Cash is an unincorporated community and census-designated place (CDP) in Chesterfield County, in the U.S. state of South Carolina. It was first listed as a CDP in the 2020 census with a population of 445.

History
The community was named after one Colonel E. B. Cash. A variant name was "Cashs". A post office called Cash's Depot was established in 1880, and remained in operation until 1917.

Demographics

2020 census

Note: the US Census treats Hispanic/Latino as an ethnic category. This table excludes Latinos from the racial categories and assigns them to a separate category. Hispanics/Latinos can be of any race.

References

Unincorporated communities in South Carolina
Unincorporated communities in Chesterfield County, South Carolina
Census-designated places in South Carolina